Drocourt is a commune in the Pas-de-Calais department in the Hauts-de-France region of France.

Geography

Population

Places of interest
 The churches of St.Leger and of St. Barbe, both dating from the twentieth century.

International relations

Drocourt is twinned with Tokarnia, Poland.

See also
Communes of the Pas-de-Calais department

References

External links

 Agglo Hénin-Carvin website 

Communes of Pas-de-Calais
Artois